Era Bernard was an Indian politician and former Member of the Legislative Assembly. He was elected to the Tamil Nadu legislative assembly as Dravida Munnetra Kazhagam candidate from Colachel constituency in Kanyakumari district in 1996 election.

References 

Dravida Munnetra Kazhagam politicians
Living people
Tamil Nadu MLAs 1996–2001
Year of birth missing (living people)